Siah Pelah-ye Sofla may refer to:

Siah Peleh-ye Sofla, Kermanshah